Nollis Marais is a South African professional rugby union coach of Pretoria-based side the  and formerly head coach of their associated Super Rugby franchise, the .

Career

Marais played club rugby in the Blue Bulls' Carlton League, where he played for Adelaar and for Naka Bulls. He played for and captained Naka Bulls from their formation in 1998 until 2003, when he took over as assistant coach to Cassie Prinsloo.

In 2005, Marais was also appointed as the head coach of Hoërskool Overkruin, guiding them to the Beeld Trophy for medium-sized schools in his first season in charge.

Marais worked as a senior logistics planner, but quit this role in 2007 to take up coaching on a full-time basis.

In 2010, Marais was appointed as the coach of university side . He won the Carlton League with them to help them qualify for the National Club Championship.

Under his tutelage, the side won the 2011 Under-21 Provincial Championship, beating the s 46–30 in the final.

Marais remained as the  coach for the 2012 Varsity Cup and helped them win the competition for the first time, beating three-time winners  by winning 29–21 in the final. He once again guided the  side to the 2012 Under-21 Provincial Championship title after they beat  22–13 in the final.

Marais helped  retain the Varsity Cup in 2013, this time beating Maties comprehensively in the final, running out 44–5 winners. That was Marais' final Varsity Cup campaign in charge of UP Tuks, with former  coach Pote Human taking over as their new coach for the 2014 Varsity Cup.

Marais led the Blue Bulls U21s to their third consecutive final in the 2013 Under-21 Provincial Championship, but fell short on this occasion, losing 23–30 in the final to Western Province U21.

Marais won the Under-21 Provincial Championship for the third time in four years in 2014, beating Western Province U21 20–10 in the final in Cape Town.

Following the departure of  head coach Frans Ludeke in June 2015, Marais was appointed as the head coach of the Blue Bulls' 2015 Currie Cup Premier Division campaign.

Shortly before the end of the 2015 Currie Cup campaign, it was announced that Marais would also take over as the head coach of the  prior to the 2016 Super Rugby season, signing a four-year contract.

References

Living people
Year of birth missing (living people)
South African rugby union coaches